Valerie Johnson Zachary (born 1962) is a North Carolina attorney who is currently a judge on the North Carolina Court of Appeals.

Zachary is a Harvard Law School graduate. She practiced law in Yadkinville, North Carolina for many years in a firm with her husband, Lee Zachary, who was elected in 2014 as a Republican to the North Carolina House of Representatives. That same election year, she ran unsuccessfully for a seat on the Court of Appeals. However, in July 2015, Zachary was appointed to the North Carolina Court of Appeals by North Carolina Governor Pat McCrory. Following a statewide race, North Carolina voters elected Judge Zachary to an eight-year term in 2016.

Education & Experience
Judge Zachary received her Juris Doctor cum laude from the Harvard Law School in 1987. In 1984, Judge Zachary graduated from Michigan State University, obtaining her Bachelor of Arts with honors in Multidisciplinary Studies, with concentrations in French, Economics, and Political Science.

While at Harvard Law School, Judge Zachary was employed as a research assistant by Professor Laurence H. Tribe, assisting in the review and revision of the second edition of Professor Tribe’s treatise American Constitutional Law. She also critiqued briefs for the Ames Moot Court Competition and served as a member of the Harvard Legal Aid Bureau and the Women’s Law Association.

Upon graduating from law school in 1987, Judge Zachary joined the litigation team of the Charlotte firm Kennedy Covington Lobdell & Hickman (now K & L Gates). In 1989, Judge Zachary returned to Yadkin County to marry her husband, Lee Zachary, and to join his general practice firm. Judge Zachary practiced law for 26 years at Zachary Law Offices in Yadkinville, where she was a partner.

In 2015, Governor Pat McCrory appointed Judge Zachary to the North Carolina Court of Appeals. Following a statewide race, North Carolina voters elected Judge Zachary to an eight-year term in 2016.

Court and Community Involvement
Since joining the Court, Judge Zachary has served in a number of important leadership roles, both internal and external. She has participated in myriad panels and CLE/CJE presentations on such wide-ranging topics as appellate writing and the importance of women judges, hosted by organizations including the North Carolina Bar Association, North Carolina Advocates for Justice, and the University of North Carolina-Chapel Hill School of Government. Judge Zachary has also presented at the biannual conference of the State’s superior court judges.

In 2017, then-Chief Judge Linda McGee appointed Judge Zachary to serve as the Court of Appeals’ representative to the North Carolina Sentencing and Policy Advisory Commission (the “Structured Sentencing Commission”), on which she serves as a general member and as a member of the Justice Reinvestment Implementation Subcommittee. Chief Judge McGee reappointed Judge Zachary to the Structured Sentencing Commission in 2019, and current Chief Judge Donna Stroud reappointed Judge Zachary for a third term in 2021.

Since 2018, Judge Zachary has been a member of the North Carolina Judicial Branch Speakers Bureau, which works to raise awareness of the role and importance of the judicial branch and the court system.

In 2018, the North Carolina Superintendent of Public Instruction appointed Judge Zachary to the North Carolina Governor’s School Board of Governors. In summer 2019, Judge Zachary was invited to present an elective course and to deliver the Convocation Address to the students and faculty of Governor’s School East.

The North Carolina Advocates for Justice honored Judge Zachary with its “Outstanding Appellate Judge” award in 2019.

From 2019 to 2020, Judge Zachary served as Co-Chair of the Judicial Division of the North Carolina Association of Women Attorneys. Through NCAWA, Judge Zachary has both led and participated in numerous Women Judges Forums at law schools statewide.

In 2020, then-Chief Justice Cheri Beasley appointed Judge Zachary to serve as Co-Chair of the newly created Chief Justice’s Commission on Fairness and Equity, and under the leadership of Chief Justice Newby, she continues to chair the Commission with Justice Michael Morgan. In December 2020, Judge Zachary was one of three North Carolina judges chosen to participate in the National Courts and Sciences Institute’s “Exponentially Sustainable Case and Evidentiary Adjudication Support for State Court Cases Emanating from the COVID-19 Pandemic” project. Upon her completion of this rigorous program, Judge Zachary will receive an NCSI certification as a Healthcare Outcomes Evidence Resource Judge for COVID-related litigation, and will have contributed to a North Carolina-specific judges desk book on COVID-related litigation.

At the Court of Appeals, Judge Zachary proudly serves the Court’s Mediation Program as a Court of Appeals mediator. She also serves on the Appellate Pro Bono Committee, the Education Committee, the Holiday Committee, the External Communications Committee, and the Appellate Mediation Committee. In addition, Judge Zachary served on the 50th Anniversary Committee, which helped plan and execute the Court’s 50th anniversary celebration in 2017. And during the 2020 pandemic, Judge Zachary presented a Webex lecture on the Seventh, Eighth, and Ninth Amendments to the United States Constitution, as part of the Court’s “North Carolina Constitutional Academy for High School Students.”

Court Admissions
All North Carolina Courts

United States Court of Appeals for the Fourth Circuit

United States Tax Court

United States District Court for the Middle District of North Carolina

United States District Court for the Western District of North Carolina

Professional Organizations
North Carolina Association of Women Attorneys

Judicial Division Co-Chair (2019-2020)

American Bar Association

Harvard Club of the Research Triangle

North Carolina Bar Association

North Carolina Supreme Court Historical Society

North Carolina State Bar

10th Judicial District Bar

Wake County Bar Association

Sir Walter Cabinet

Susie M. Sharp Inn of Court

References

1962 births
Living people
American women judges
Harvard Law School alumni
North Carolina Court of Appeals judges
North Carolina Republicans
People from Yadkinville, North Carolina
21st-century American women